Crazy Horse is a 1996 American Western television film based on the true story of Crazy Horse, a Native American war leader of the Oglala Lakota, and the Battle of Little Bighorn.

The film is directed by John Irvin and stars Michael Greyeyes as Crazy Horse. Ned Beatty stars as Dr. McGillicuddy, Irene Bedard as Black Buffalo Woman, Wes Studi as Red Cloud and Peter Horton as George Armstrong Custer.

Other First Nation stars include Jimmy Herman as Conquering Bear, August Schellenberg as Sitting Bull, Gordon Tootoosis as Akicita and Lorne Cardinal as Young Man Afraid.

It was shot in Black Hills, South Dakota.

Cast
Michael Greyeyes as Crazy Horse
Irene Bedard as Black Buffalo Woman
Ned Beatty as Dr. Valentine McGillicuddy
Peter Horton as George Armstrong Custer
Jimmy Herman as Conquering Bear
Gordon Tootoosis as Akicita 
Lorne Cardinal as Young Man Afraid of His Horses
August Schellenberg as Sitting Bull
Wes Studi as Red Cloud 
Daniel Studi as Wasu 
Scott Means as No Water
Larry Sellers as Spotted Tail

References

External links

1996 television films
1996 films
American television films
1996 drama films
Films shot in South Dakota
American films based on actual events
Films directed by John Irvin
Films about Native Americans
Cultural depictions of George Armstrong Custer
Cultural depictions of Crazy Horse
1990s English-language films